Marisela de Montecristo (born 25 August 1992) is a Salvadoran-born model, television presenter, actress, and beauty pageant titleholder who has been crowned Nuestra Belleza Latina 2013 and Miss El Salvador 2018.

After winning Nuestra Belleza Latina 2013, de Montecristo made appearances on several television shows, was a backstage presenter on Premios Juventud, worked as a model on Sábado Gigante, and made a cameo appearance in the "Fun" music video by Pitbull. As Miss El Salvador 2018, she represented El Salvador at Miss Universe 2018 but failed to place in the Top 20.

Early life
De Montecristo was born on 25 August 1992 in Olocuilta, La Paz. When she was ten years old, the family left El Salvador and settled in Las Vegas, Nevada in the United States. She studied communications at university.

Pageantry
In 2013, de Montecristo auditioned in Los Angeles to be a part of Nuestra Belleza Latina 2013, a Latina beauty pageant reality show broadcast on Univision. During the competition, her mentor was Venezuelan Osmel Sousa. She was ultimately selected as one of the twelve finalists, and progressed each week until being declared as the winner. De Montecristo became the first woman from El Salvador to win the competition, in addition to being only the second Central American after Nastassja Bolívar of Nicaragua won Nuestra Belleza Latina 2011. Following her win, she was awarded US$250,000, a new Kia Forte, and a year-long television presenting contract with Univision.

Following her reign as Nuestra Belleza Latina 2013, de Montecristo had planned to take part in Nuestra Belleza El Salvador 2015 competition. However, she dropped out following comments against Mexican immigrants said by Donald Trump, who owned the Miss Universe Organization at the time, which the winner of Nuestra Belleza El Salvador went on to compete in. After Trump sold the organization to WME-IMG, de Montecristo announced that she would compete in the Miss El Salvador 2018 competition. She won and was crowned Miss El Salvador 2018. She went on to represent El Salvador at Miss Universe 2018, where she was unplaced.

References

External links

1992 births
American female models
American television hosts
Female models from Nevada
Living people
Miss El Salvador winners
Miss Universe 2018 contestants
Nuestra Belleza Latina winners
People from La Paz Department (El Salvador)
People from Las Vegas
Salvadoran beauty pageant winners
Salvadoran emigrants to the United States
Salvadoran female models
Salvadoran television presenters
Univision people
American women television presenters
Salvadoran women television presenters
21st-century American women